Dawn Eden Goldstein is an American Roman Catholic author and journalist who was formerly a rock music historian and tabloid newspaper headline writer. Prior to 2016, she used the pen name Dawn Eden.

Goldstein was born to a Reform Jewish household. She is the grand-niece of poet Alma Denny.

Early career
Goldstein began writing about rock music under the abbreviated name "Dawn Eden" in 1985 for fanzines, eventually becoming a popular-music historian, writing for Mojo, Salon, New York Press, and Billboard, among others. In 1989 she graduated from New York University with a degree in Communications.

From 1990 through the early 2000s, she wrote liner notes for more than seventy CD reissues.  Artists she interviewed include Harry Nilsson, Del Shannon, and Lesley Gore.

She spent years researching and championing the music and life of sunshine pop progenitor Curt Boettcher and wrote liner notes for several collections of his work.

Religious conversion and subsequent achievements
In 1999, Goldstein had a "born-again" experience that led her to become a Protestant Christian.  In 2006, she was received into the Roman Catholic Church.

She worked as a copy editor at the New York Post from early 2002 to January 2005. A headline she wrote about a toilet-bowl collapse ("Hurt in line of doody") won first place in the "Brightest Headline" category of the 2004 New York State Associated Press Awards. She was forced to leave the Post after edits she made to a story about in vitro fertilization revealed her pro-life sympathies. The firing led The New York Observer to publish a front-page profile of her by George Gurley, "Eden in Exile".

Goldstein was hired in April 2005 by the New York Daily News as assistant news editor of its newly relaunched National Edition. She later became deputy news editor for the newspaper's new weekly regional editions.

Goldstein left the Daily News in 2007 to move to Washington, D.C., where, in 2008, she was successfully treated for thyroid cancer.

In May 2010, she received an M.A. in theology from the Dominican House of Studies after defending her master's thesis, a critique of Christopher West's presentation of Pope John Paul II's theology of the body. Three months later, after Alice von Hildebrand cited Goldstein's research in her own critique of West, the Catholic News Agency made the thesis available for download.

After receiving her sacred theology licentiate from the Dominican House of Studies in 2014, Goldstein began working toward a Doctor of Sacred Theology degree at the University of St. Mary of the Lake.

In May 2016, Goldstein became the first woman in the University of St. Mary of the Lake's history to receive a Doctor of Sacred Theology degree. Around this time, after years of writing under the name "Dawn Eden," she reclaimed her birth surname, as reported in the Chicago Tribune.

From September 2017 to May 2019 she served as assistant professor of Dogmatic Theology at Holy Apostles College and Seminary, in Cromwell, Connecticut.

Books

Her first book The Thrill of the Chaste was published by Thomas Nelson in December 2006; she promoted it with appearances on the Eternal Word Television Network and NBC's Today Show. The Thrill of the Chaste (Catholic Edition), a revised version of her 2006 work, was issued in January 2015 by Ave Maria Press.

Goldstein's second book, My Peace I Give You: Healing Sexual Wounds with the Help of the Saints, was published in April 2012 by Ave Maria Press. In November 2012, on the Eternal Word Television Network television program The Journey Home, she told the story of her conversion to the Catholic faith and spoke about healing from childhood sexual abuse.

Her third book, Remembering God's Mercy: Redeem the Past and Free Yourself from Painful Memories, was published by Ave Maria Press in February 2016. She discussed the book in an interview with Kathryn Jean Lopez at National Review. The book won first place in the Inspirational category of the Association of Catholic Publishers 2017 Excellence in Publishing Awards.

In March 2019 her fourth book, Sunday Will Never Be the Same: A Rock & Roll Journalist Opens Her Ears to God, was published by Catholic Answers. It was the first book published under Goldstein's full birth name. The work recounts Goldstein's spiritual journey "from the temples of her childhood Judaism to the music clubs of Greenwich Village, where she became an acolyte of a new religion: rock & roll". Thereafter the book chronicles Goldstein's eventual conversion to Roman Catholicism. (The book's title, Sunday Will Never Be the Same, alludes to a 1967 Top 10 hit by the pop group Spanky and Our Gang.)

Goldstein's fifth book, Father Ed: The Story of Bill W.'s Spiritual Sponsor, published by Orbis Books in November 2022, was a biography of Father Edward Dowling, SJ. Publishers Weekly called it "a powerful take on an often overlooked spiritual influence on Alcoholics Anonymous."

Bibliography

as Dawn Eden

as Dawn Eden Goldstein

References

External links 
 

Living people
Converts to Evangelicalism from Judaism
Converts to Roman Catholicism from Evangelicalism
American Roman Catholics
American music critics
Roman Catholic writers
New York University alumni
University of Saint Mary of the Lake alumni
American women journalists
American religious writers
Women religious writers
American women music critics
20th-century American journalists
20th-century American women writers
20th-century American writers
21st-century American journalists
21st-century American women writers
Dominican House of Studies alumni
Journalists from New York City
1968 births